Jan Gerbrand Wyers (born January 2, 1939), is a retired American politician who was a member of the Oregon State Senate. He also worked as an attorney.  He later served as a judge in the Multnomah County Circuit Court, until retiring in 2006.

References

1939 births
Living people
People from Hood River, Oregon
Lawyers from Portland, Oregon
Politicians from Portland, Oregon
Circuit court judges in the United States
Democratic Party Oregon state senators